Estonian Coalition Party was an Estonian centre-right liberal political party. Founded in 1991 by Tiit Vähi, it disbanded in 2002. The party was an observing member of Liberal International from 1998 on. It had contacts with parties like Latvian Way and participated in the ruling coalition of 1995-1999. A party mostly uniting former (urban) nomenklatura and other Soviet era officials, it was closely allied with the Party of Rural People, which, however, represented more populist, centre-left ideology.

Electoral results

Parliamentary elections

References

1991 establishments in Estonia
2001 disestablishments in Estonia
Centrist parties in Estonia
Defunct political parties in Estonia
Liberal parties in Estonia
Political parties disestablished in 2001
Political parties established in 1991